Quintus Minucius Thermus may refer to:

 Quintus Minucius Thermus (consul 193 BC)
 Quintus Minucius Thermus (governor of Asia)